A list of notable politicians of the Alliance 90/The Greens, the Green party of Germany:

A
 Tarek Al-Wazir
 Jan Philipp Albrecht
 Elmar Altvater
 Carl Amery
 Kerstin Andreae
 Michael Arnold

B
 Marieluise Beck
 Volker Beck
 Angelika Beer (now PIRATEN)
 Cornelia Behm
 Birgitt Bender
 Silvia Bender
 Matthias Berninger
 Marianne Birthler
 Alexander Bonde
 Franziska Brantner
 Bernhard Braun
 Hiltrud Breyer
 Ralf Briese
 Reinhard Bütikofer

C
 Daniel Cohn-Bendit
 Michael Cramer

D
 Rangin Dadfar Spanta
 Sepp Daxenberger
 Ekin Deligöz

F
 Katharina Fegebank
 Hans-Josef Fell
 Andrea Fischer
 Joschka Fischer
 Ossip K. Flechtheim
 Ralf Fücks

G
 Kai Gehring
 Sven Giegold
 Christa Goetsch
 Katrin Göring-Eckardt
 Friedrich-Wilhelm Graefe zu Baringdorf
 Friedel Grützmacher

H
 Robert Habeck
 Gerald Häfner
 Enno Hagenah
 Anja Hajduk
 Rebecca Harms
 Martin Häusling
 Gabriele Heinen-Kljajic
 Monika Heinold
 Brigitte Heinrich
Sarah-Lee Heinrich
 Ursula Helmhold
 Bettina Herlitzius
 Winfried Hermann
 Kurt Herzog
 Anton Hofreiter
 Bärbel Höhn
 Milan Horáček

J
 Michael Jacobi
 Ulla Jelpke (now DIE LINKE)

K
 Gisela Kallenbach
 Ska Keller
 Petra Kelly
 Hans-Jürgen Klein
 Sibyll-Anka Klotz
 Wilhelm Knabe
 Jan Korte
 Ina Korter
 Wolfgang Kreissl-Dörfler
 Winfried Kretschmann
 Fritz Kuhn
 Renate Künast

L
 Eveline Lemke
 Vera Lengsfeld (now CDU)
 Helge Limburg
 Karoline Linnert
 Corny Littmann
 Sylvia Löhrmann
 Anna Lührmann

M
 Christian Meyer (Bündnis 90/Die Grünen)
 Jerzy Montag
 Kerstin Müller
 Özcan Mutlu

N
 Winfried Nachtwei
 Wolfgang Nešković
 Mona Neubaur
 Ehrhart Neubert
 Omid Nouripour

O
 Jutta Oesterle-Schwerin
 Cem Özdemir

P
 Boris Palmer
 Lisa Paus
 Simone Peter
 Filiz Polat
 Ramona Pop

R
 Gerold Rahmann
 Claudia Roth
 Heide Rühle
 Herbert Rusche
 Barbara Rütting

S
 Rüdiger Sagel
 Dieter Salomon
 Ulle Schauws 
 Gerhard Schick
 Frithjof Schmidt
 Michaele Schreyer
 Elisabeth Schroedter
 Werner Schulz
 Frank Schwalba-Hoth
 Sarah Sorge
 Malte Spitz
 Grietje Staffelt
 Miriam Staudte
 Silke Stokar von Neuforn
 Eckhard Stratmann-Mertens
 Hans-Christian Ströbele

T
 Wilfried Telkämper
 Jürgen Trittin
 Helga Trüpel
 Elke Twesten (now CDU)

U
 Wolfgang Ullmann

V
 Roland Vogt
 Antje Vollmer

W
 Stefan Wenzel
 Heike Wilms-Kegel
 Harald Wolf
 Thomas Wüppesahl

 
Alliance 90 The Greens